Harlan Disberry McChesney (June 12, 1895 – March 12, 1954) was an American football and basketball coach. He served as the head football coach at Kansas State Normal School—now known as Emporia State University— in 1918 and at Lawrence University in Appleton, Wisconsin from 1920 to 1922, compiling a career college football coaching record of 20–5–1.  McChesney was also the head basketball coach at Kansas State Normal for one season, in 1916–17, and at Lawrence from 1920 to 1923, tallying a career college basketball coaching record of 28–18.

McChesney was a veteran of the Iowa National Guard.  He died in Utah of a cerebral hemorrhage 1954.

Head coaching record

Football

References

External links
 

1895 births
1954 deaths
Basketball coaches from Iowa
Emporia State Hornets basketball coaches
Emporia State Hornets football coaches
Lawrence Vikings football coaches
Lawrence Vikings men's basketball coaches
People from Burlington, Iowa